Jeffrey Lee Yeates (born August 3, 1951) is a former American football defensive lineman. He played college football at Boston College. He was drafted in the fourth round (103rd overall) of the 1973 NFL Draft by the Buffalo Bills.

Career
In 1971 Yeates was named to the UPI All-East all-star team, as well as the AP All-East all-star team.

Yeates was selected in the fourth round (103rd overall) of the 1973 NFL Draft by the Buffalo Bills. After appearing in three games for the Bills in 1976, he was waived, and later signed by the Atlanta Falcons. In September 1977, he was waived by the Falcons. In 1978, he became a starter after Claude Humphrey retired. In 1980, when the Falcons switched to a 3-4 defense, Yeates was a starting defensive end alongside Jeff Merrow. He was released by the Falcons in August 1984.

References

1951 births
Living people
American football defensive linemen
Boston College Eagles football players
Buffalo Bills players
Atlanta Falcons players